X is the tenth studio album by American country music artist Trace Adkins. The album's name is the Roman numeral for ten, as counting his two Greatest Hits packages it is his tenth album overall. X was released November 25, 2008, on Capitol Records Nashville. The album includes the singles "Muddy Water", "Marry for Money", and "All I Ask For Anymore", all of which have charted in the Top 40 on Hot Country Songs, with the latter two becoming Top 20 hits.

Other songs

After Adkins performed a moving version of "'Til the Last Shot's Fired" with The West Point Cadet Glee Club live at the Academy of Country Music Awards in 2009, the song received unsolicited airplay which brought it to No. 50 on the U.S. Billboard Hot Country Songs chart while "Marry for Money" was charting. It also peaked at No. 5 on the Bubbling Under Hot 100.

Although considered one of the highlights of the album by critics and fans, "I Can't Outrun You" was not released as a single, although it received a music video treatment. It was later covered by Thompson Square on their 2013 album Just Feels Good, whose version was released to country radio on June 23, 2014, and reached a peak of number 52 on the Billboard Country Airplay chart. It was also covered by the country acapella band, Home Free in 2017 with a video.

Track listing

Personnel
Trace Adkins - lead vocals
Pat Bergeson - acoustic guitar
Mike Brignardello - bass guitar
Jim "Moose" Brown - clavinet, Hammond B-3 organ, keyboards, piano
Pat Buchanan - baritone guitar, electric guitar, harp
John Catchings - cello
J.T. Corenflos - baritone guitar, electric guitar
Eric Darken- percussion
Shannon Forrest - drums
Paul Franklin - steel guitar
Kenny Greenberg - baritone guitar, electric guitar
Aubrey Haynie - fiddle, mandolin
Wes Hightower - background vocals
John Hobbs - conductor, string arrangements 
Dann Huff - electric guitar
Ben Issacs - background vocals
Sonya Issacs - background vocals
Mike Johnson - dobro, steel guitar
Love Sponge String Quartet- strings
B. James Lowry - acoustic guitar
Greg Morrow - drums
Gordon Mote - Hammond B-3 organ, piano
Frank Rogers - banjo, electric guitar
Bryan Sutton - banjo, acoustic guitar, national steel guitar
Ilya Toshinsky - banjo
West Point Cadet Glee Club - background vocals

Chart performance

Weekly charts

Year-end charts

Singles

Other charted songs

References

2008 albums
Trace Adkins albums
Capitol Records albums
Albums produced by Frank Rogers (record producer)